Hampden Zane Churchill Cockburn  (19 November 1867 – 12 July 1913) was a Canadian soldier, and recipient of the Victoria Cross, the  most prestigious award for gallantry in the face of the enemy that can be awarded to British and Commonwealth forces.

Early life
Born in Toronto, Ontario, Canada, Cockburn was a graduate of Upper Canada College in Toronto. On 20 November 1891, Cockburn joined the Canadian Militia and was commissioned as a Second Lieutenant with The Governor General's Body Guard.

Second Boer War 
When the Second Boer War broke out in 1899, Cockburn then a 32-year-old lieutenant volunteered for service in The Royal Canadian Dragoons, Canadian Militia, and was posted to South Africa with the regiment, where the action took place for which he was awarded the VC.

On 7 November 1900, during the Battle of Leliefontein near the Komati River, a large force of Boer commandos sought to encircle a retreating British column whose rearguard comprised two troops of Royal Canadian Dragoons and two 12-pounder guns of "D" Battery, Royal Canadian Field Artillery. Cockburn and Lieutenant Richard Turner commanded a small group of troopers who repulsed the Boers at close range, allowing the two field guns to escape capture. Sergeant Edward Holland of the Royal Canadian Dragoons, ably assisted them with good machine-gun work, finally fleeing in the face of superior Boer force with the machine gun under his arm to avoid its capture. All the men under Cockburn's command were either killed, wounded or captured. Cockburn was also wounded during the action.

Following the battle, three men of the Royal Canadian Dragoons were awarded the Victoria Cross: Cockburn, Turner and Holland.

The citations were published in the London Gazette of 23 April 1901. Cockburn's read:

Return to Canada 
Following the Boer War, Cockburn returned to Canada, and eventually achieved the rank of major. He died in a horse-riding accident in Grayburn, Saskatchewan, in 1913, and was buried at St. James Cemetery, Toronto, Ontario, with a headstone at Hill A, Section S 1/2, Lot 11.

Medal 
Cockburn's Victoria Cross and sword were, for many years, displayed in the lobby of his alma mater, Upper Canada College. In 1977, the school had a high-quality copy made for display, and moved the original to safe-keeping.

Gallery

References

Sources
 Monuments to Courage (David Harvey, 1999)
 The Register of the Victoria Cross (This England, 1997)
 Victoria Crosses of the Anglo-Boer War (Ian Uys, 20

External links 
 Anglo-Boer War.com
 Legion Magazine article on Hampden Zane Churchill Cockburn

1867 births
1913 deaths
People from Old Toronto
Royal Canadian Dragoons officers
Canadian military personnel of the Second Boer War
Second Boer War recipients of the Victoria Cross
Hampden
Upper Canada College alumni
Accidental deaths in Saskatchewan
Deaths by horse-riding accident in Canada
Burials at St. James Cemetery, Toronto
Canadian Militia officers
Royal Canadian Dragoons
Governor General's Horse Guards
Governor General's Horse Guards officers